Chaqa Narges Rural District is a rural district (dehestan) in Mahidasht District, Kermanshah County, Kermanshah Province, Iran. At the 2006 census, its population was 7,296, in 1,592 families. The rural district has 40 villages.

References 

Rural Districts of Kermanshah Province
Kermanshah County